Patala is a town and a nagar panchayat in Ghaziabad district in the Indian state of Uttar Pradesh.

Demographics
As of the 2001 Census of India, Patala had a population of 9,730. Males constitute 54% of the population and females 46%. Patala has an average literacy rate of 61%, higher than the national average of 59.5%: male literacy is 70%, and female literacy is 51%. In Patala, 14% of the population is under 6 years of age.

References

Cities and towns in Ghaziabad district, India